Ais Gill rail accident may refer to:

1913 Ais Gill rail accident
1995 Ais Gill rail accident